The 2015 Monmouth Hawks football team represented Monmouth University in the 2015 NCAA Division I FCS football season as a members of Big South Conference. They were led by 23rd-year head coach Kevin Callahan and played their home games at Kessler Field. Monmouth finished the season 5–6 overall and 3–3 in Big South play to tie for third place.

Schedule

Game summaries

Holy Cross

at Central Michigan

at Wagner

at Fordham

Bryant

at Charleston Southern

Liberty

Coastal Carolina

at Kennesaw State

Presbyterian

at Gardner–Webb

References

Monmouth
Monmouth Hawks football seasons
Monmouth Hawks football